J. Roger Clinch (born 8 January 1947 in Bathurst, New Brunswick) was a Progressive Conservative party member of the House of Commons of Canada.  He was a school administrator and principal by career.

Clinch was first elected at the Gloucester electoral district in the 1984 federal election.  He left federal politics after serving in the 33rd Canadian Parliament and did not campaign in the 1988 federal election.

He served as Chief of Staff to Premier David Alward from September 2013 until October 2014.

External links
 

1947 births
Living people
Members of the House of Commons of Canada from New Brunswick
People from Bathurst, New Brunswick
Progressive Conservative Party of Canada MPs